was established by Daisaku Ikeda and opened near the Sōka University campus in Hachiōji, Tokyo, Japan, in 1983. The new wing was added in 2008. The collection of some thirty thousand works spans the arts and cultures of Japan, Asia, and Europe, and the Museum takes touring exhibitions to other countries. The Fuji Art Museum is owned by the Sôka Gakkai sect, and its collection was bought using the billions of dollars donated by its worshipers. 

Part of the collection of the Tokyo Fuji Art Museum is suspected to be made of stolen pieces, bought by the museum without knowing it. The Tavola Doria, a Renaissance masterpiece attributed to Leonardo da Vinci, was stolen in Italy in the '60s, and acquired by the museum in 1992. The Italian government had to lead tight negotiations with the museum, which eventually agreed to return the da Vinci panel in 2012.
In 2015, an American lawyer contacted the museum about a painting by British painter Joshua Reynolds, stolen in the UK in 1984, and bought by the museum years later. The Fuji Art Museum legally refused to return the painting to the owner, and asked for a one million pound compensation. 

It was also widely commented by the Japanese press that the museum and the Sôka Gakkai overpaid two paintings by french impressionist Renoir in 1990, and was then suspected of tax evasion.

Gallery

See also
 List of museums in Tokyo

References

External links
 Tokyo Fuji Art Museum 
Virtual tour of the Tokyo Fuji Art Museum provided by Google Arts & Culture

Art museums and galleries in Tokyo
Hachiōji, Tokyo
Art museums established in 1983
1983 establishments in Japan